Archway is a London Underground station at the intersection of Holloway Road, Highgate Hill, Junction Road and Archway Road in Archway, north London, directly underneath the Vantage Point building. It is on the High Barnet branch of the Northern line, between Highgate and Tufnell Park stations, in Zones 2 and 3.

Location

When constructed, the area was simply the northern end of Holloway Road and had no specific name but, in the hope of attracting patronage, the terminus was originally named Highgate after the village up the hill. At the time of the station's construction the first cable tramway in Europe operated non-stop up Highgate Hill to the village from outside the Archway Tavern, and this name was also considered for the station. The main station entrance now lies beneath Archway Tower (now renamed Vantage Point) on Junction Road while the side entrance is on Highgate Hill.

History

The Leslie Green designed station opened on 22 June 1907, under the name Highgate faced in Green's standard ox-blood glazed brick. It was opened as one of the northern terminals of what was then the Charing Cross, Euston & Hampstead Railway (CCE&HR).

The station was renamed Archway (Highgate) on 11 June 1939 (after the nearby road bridge over the deep cutting containing Archway Road). On 3 July 1939, the line was extended to the Great Northern Railway's station at Highgate and East Finchley station as part of the New Works Programme. The station was renamed Highgate (Archway) on 19 January 1941, before becoming just Archway in December 1947 with the Highgate name being reassigned to the new station constructed beneath the London and North Eastern Railway (LNER) high-level station of the same name.

On 2 June 2006, a train derailed while entering the reversing siding at the station.

Design
In 1930 the station was upgraded with escalators to replace the original lifts and the secondary entrance was replaced with a modern design by Charles Holden, virtually identical to the one he built at the same time at Hammersmith. Holden's station was replaced in the 1970s.

The platform walls once featured the distinctive and elegantly simple tiling schemes used by Holden on the underground stations constructed at this time. Cream tiles were used throughout with the station name band formed of letter shaped tiles inset into a background of cream tiles incised to accept the lettering. Similar tiling schemes can be seen at the neighbouring Highgate station, as well as at Bethnal Green and the stations on the tunnelled section of the Hainault branch of the Central line (for example Gants Hill). All were built in the late 1930s/early 1940s. The tiles at Archway were replaced several years ago during retiling works.

The station currently (as of 2015) has escalators (Otis type HD-B) to get down to the platforms. Alternatively, passengers can use the 113 steps to get down to the platforms.

Crossover and siding

When the original section of the Northern Line from Charing Cross to Golders Green and Archway (then Highgate) was opened in 1907, the terminus at Archway was provided with a scissors crossover just south of the station and the running lines beyond the north end of the platforms continued as separate dead-end sidings. When the line was extended to Highgate and East Finchley in 1939, the 'northbound' siding was extended as the northbound road while the 'southbound' siding was retained as a dead-end siding, extended at the north end with the new southbound line from Highgate joining it just before the southbound platform and a new connection from the northbound line to the siding, thus turning the old 'southbound' siding into a central reversing siding. The crossover south of the station was subsequently converted to a single trailing crossover but was decommissioned on 15 October 1967, when Archway was converted to programme-machine control from Cobourg Street. The signal box closed on 25 June 1961 when Archway became remote-controlled.

The enlarged crossover tunnel remains although cable runs extend down its centre between the two tracks for most of its length. The layout of the platforms and the underground passenger areas still reflect the station's former role as a terminus.

Services
Northern line trains generally operate between Morden or Kennington to Edgware, High Barnet or Mill Hill East via the Charing Cross or the Bank branch. Occasionally and during disruptions or engineering works, trains can terminate at Archway. Train frequencies vary throughout the day, but generally operate every 3–7 minutes between 05:58 and 00:19 in both directions.

Connections
London Buses routes 4, 17, 41, 43, 134, 143, 210, 234, 263, 390, C11, W5 and night routes N20, N41 and N271 serve the station.
London Underground maps and maps in London Overground trains show the station as 450m from Upper Holloway station on the Gospel Oak to Barking line. Interchange within twenty minutes is allowed between the two stations.

Notes and references

Notes

References

External links

 London Transport Museum Photographic Archive
 
 
 
 
 Archway station on Multimap
 Design drawing by Charles Holden and photograph, 1930s from Royal Institute of British Architects

Northern line stations
Tube stations in the London Borough of Islington
Former Charing Cross, Euston and Hampstead Railway stations
Railway stations in Great Britain opened in 1907
London Underground Night Tube stations